R. Richard Geddes is an American academic specializing in infrastructure policy. He is a professor of policy analysis and management at Cornell University, where he is director of its infrastructure program.

Geddes is an expert in public–private partnerships.  He is a visiting scholar at the American Enterprise Institute.

Education
Geddes was educated at Towson State University (BS 1984) and the University of Chicago (MA 1987, PhD 1991).

Public Policy
Geddes is a recognized authority on transportation issues, being interviewed for NPR's On Point.  He writes as well for the Wall Street Journal.

He has testified before House and Senate Committees ten times since 2008, most frequently about federal spending on railroads and the Postal Service.

Geddes has observed that public-private partnerships are unlikely to take hold in the United States, as long as less risky municipal bond funding for projects is common.

References

Selected publications

 Richard Geddes, R. (2005). Policy Watch: Reform of the U.S. Postal Service. Journal of Economic Perspectives. 19. 217-232. .

Cornell University faculty
University of Chicago alumni
Reports of the United States government
American economists
Date of birth missing (living people)
Living people
Year of birth missing (living people)